Agyeman is a surname. Notable people with the surname include:

Agyeman Prempeh Opoku (born 1989), Ghanaian football player
Albert Agyeman (born 1977), Ghanaian sprinter
Dickson Agyeman (born 1985), Belgian football player
Edward Agyeman-Duah (born 1973), Ghanaian football player
Emmanuel Agyemang-Badu (born 1990), Ghanaian football player
Fredua Agyeman (1797–1867), Asantehene (King of the Ashanti), 1834-1867
Freema Agyeman (born 1979), British actress
Hackman Owusu-Agyeman (born 1941), Ghanaian politician
Julian Agyeman (born 1958), urban planning and environmental social science scholar 
Nana Konadu Agyeman Rawlings (born 1948), First Lady of Ghana

See also
Agyeman Badu Stadium, multi-use stadium in Dormaa Ahenkro, Ghana

Surnames of Akan origin